Nadrian C. "Ned" Seeman (December 16, 1945 – November 16, 2021) was an American nanotechnologist and crystallographer known for inventing the field of DNA nanotechnology.

Biography 
Seeman studied biochemistry at the University of Chicago and crystallography at the University of Pittsburgh.  He became a faculty member at the State University of New York at Albany, and in 1988 moved to the Department of Chemistry at New York University.

He is most noted for his development of the concept of DNA nanotechnology beginning in the early 1980s.  In fall 1980, while at a campus pub, Seeman was inspired by the M. C. Escher woodcut Depth to realize that a three-dimensional lattice could be constructed from DNA.  He realized that this could be used to orient target molecules, simplifying their crystallographic study by eliminating the difficult process of obtaining pure crystals.  In pursuit of this goal, Seeman's laboratory published the synthesis of the first three-dimensional nanoscale object, a cube made of DNA, in 1991. This work won the 1995 Feynman Prize in Nanotechnology. The concept of the dissimilar double DNA crossover introduced by Seeman, was important stepping stone towards the development of DNA origami.  The goal of demonstrating designed three-dimensional DNA crystals was achieved by Seeman in 2009, nearly thirty years after his original elucidation of the idea.

The concepts of DNA nanotechnology later found further applications in DNA computing, DNA nanorobotics, and self-assembly of nanoelectronics.  He shared the Kavli Prize in Nanoscience 2010 with Donald Eigler “for their development of unprecedented methods to control matter on the nanoscale.” He was a fellow of the Norwegian Academy of Science and Letters.

He was an atheist. Seeman died on November 16, 2021, at the age of 75.

Notable publications 

 —Considered to be the earliest paper outlining the concepts of DNA nanotechnology
 —The synthesis of the DNA cube
 —The synthesis of two-dimensional periodic lattices of double crossover molecules
 —The first DNA-based nanomechanical device
 —A popular science article explaining the field of DNA nanotechnology
 —The synthesis of three-dimensional periodic lattices of tensegrity triangle molecules
 —A DNA-based molecular assembly line

See also 

 History of DNA nanotechnology

References

External links 
 

1945 births
2021 deaths
American crystallographers
American atheists
New York University faculty
University of Chicago alumni
University of Pittsburgh alumni
DNA nanotechnology people
University at Albany, SUNY faculty
Members of the Norwegian Academy of Science and Letters
Kavli Prize laureates in Nanoscience